Japan competed at the 1998 Winter Paralympics in Nagano, Japan. 67 competitors from Japan won 41 medals including 12 gold, 16 silver and 13 bronze and finished 4th in the medal table.

See also 
 Japan at the Paralympics
 Japan at the 1998 Winter Olympics

References 

Japan at the Paralympics
1998 in Japanese sport
Nations at the 1998 Winter Paralympics